The Piedmont ecoregion is a United States ecoregion designated by the U.S. Environmental Protection Agency (EPA) and the Commission for Environmental Cooperation (CEC).

Considered the non-mountainous portion of the old Appalachian Highlands by physiographers, the northeast-southwest trending Piedmont ecoregion comprises a transitional area between the mostly mountainous ecoregions of the Appalachians to the northwest and the relatively flat coastal plain to the southeast. It is a complex mosaic of Precambrian and Paleozoic metamorphic and igneous rocks, with moderately dissected irregular plains and some hills. The soils tend to be finer-textured than in coastal plain regions. Once largely cultivated, much of this region has reverted to successional pine and hardwood woodlands, with an increasing conversion to an urban and suburban land cover.

References

External links 
 USGS – Piedmont (public-domain origin of the text in this article)

Ecoregions of the United States